Tuula Anneli Björkling (born 1952) is a Finnish beauty queen who was adjudged Miss International 1973 on 13 October, held at the Exposition Hall Fairgrounds in Osaka, Japan. She is the first Finn to win the title.

Björkling joined the Miss World 1972 pageant in London, United Kingdom, wherein she placed sixth. She is also the winner of the Miss Scandinavia 1973 contest, held in Helsinki, Finland.

References

External links
 Miss International former titleholders (official website)

Miss International winners
Miss International 1973 delegates
Miss World 1972 delegates
Living people
1952 births
Finnish beauty pageant winners
Place of birth missing (living people)